Onaping Falls (1996 census population 5,277) was a town in the Canadian province of Ontario, which existed from 1973 to 2000. It was created as part of the Regional Municipality of Sudbury, and took its name from the waterfalls (High Falls) on the Onaping River.

On January 1, 2001, the town and the Regional Municipality were dissolved and amalgamated into the city of Greater Sudbury. The town is now part of Ward 3 on Greater Sudbury City Council, and is represented by councillor Gerry Montpellier.

In the Canada 2011 Census, the main communities in Onaping Falls were listed for the first time as two of six distinct population centres (or urban areas) in Greater Sudbury: Dowling (population 1,690, density 475.0 km2) and Onaping-Levack (population 2,042, density 251.3 km2). In the Canada 2016 Census, Onaping-Levack was dropped from the city's list of population centres, due to its population density falling below the 400/km2 standard, but Dowling was recorded as having a population of 1,466.

Communities

Onaping Falls is an amalgamation of three local communities: Dowling, Onaping, and Levack. Dowling is located 11 km from Onaping along Highway 144, while Levack is located north of the highway along Municipal Road 8. The smaller subdivisions of Levack Station and Phelans are also located along Highway 144 between Dowling and Onaping.

The area is known for its recreational abundance; fishing, hunting, snowmobiling, cross-country and downhill skiing and most other recreational sports are common activities of the residents.

It has become famous for High Falls, where the Onaping River drops 55 metres in a single plunge. The town is at the point where the Canadian Shield meets the Sudbury Nickel Irruptive, caused by a meteorite strike two billion years ago. There is a lookout off Highway 144 called the A. Y. Jackson Lookout, for the famous Group of Seven artist who memorialized the view on his canvas.

The town is also home to Windy Lake Provincial Park.

History
Prior to the early 1970s, Levack and Onaping were company towns with no direct municipal government. Dowling was part of Dowling Township, which was already incorporated as a municipality.

With the advent of regional government in 1973, the town of Onaping Falls became a part of the Regional Municipality of Sudbury, which also included the towns of Rayside-Balfour, Nickel Centre, Walden, Valley East and Capreol. The name "Onaping Falls" was chosen electorally between three contentious names: "Mountainvale" submitted by Levack resident Mary Carol McLellan, "Onaping Falls", submitted by Onaping resident Ted Cunningham and "Dowling", submitted by Dowling council.  Mr. Cunningham received $25 for submitting the chosen name.

The first mayor of Onaping Falls was Jim Coady, for whom the ice arena in Levack is named. Other mayors of Onaping Falls between 1973 and absorption into the City of Greater Sudbury were Bob Parker, Shirley Mirka and Jean Guy "Chummy" Quesnel.

Politics
Onaping Falls is currently part of Ward 3 on Greater Sudbury City Council, along with much of the former town of Rayside-Balfour. A Community Solutions team was established in April 2006   to deal with challenges to the amalgamation of the former towns into one City of Greater Sudbury. The Community Solutions Team was made up with representatives from across the new city (Jack Oatway, Marc Tasse, Martha Cunningham Closs, Keir Kitchen, Barry Brett, France Belanger-Houle, Gisele Chretien) and chaired by Floyd Laughren. The final report called the Constellation City listed many improvements to Greater Sudbury's municipal governance  The committee visited and spoke to citizens in several corners of the city and all former towns.  The report completed in 2007, recommended the former Onaping Falls be reconstituted as its own ward on city council, although this has not occurred to date.

1973 Railway disaster
On November 9, 1973, Onaping Falls was the site of a truck - train collision which caused more than a 1,000 gallon spill at the New Cobden Road crossing off Highway 144 about 2 miles northwest of Dowling. Traces of PCB's were found in the water table four years   after the crash.

Notable people
Notable people from the Onaping Falls area include Olympian Joe Derochie (Canoe, 1960 Rome),  National Hockey League players Dave Taylor (Los Angeles Kings), Dave Hannan (Pittsburgh Penguins) and Troy Mallette (Ottawa Senators), Olympic cyclist Eric Wohlberg, Paralympian (rowing) Steven Daniel and author Mark Leslie (Lefebvre). Recording artist and singer/songwriter Kevin Closs has made his home in Onaping Falls since 1990.

Images

References

External links
http://www.onleoracle.ca/ofcan/
 Onaping Falls Community Action Network
 History of Onaping Falls at Greater Sudbury Heritage Museums

Neighbourhoods in Greater Sudbury
Populated places established in 1973
Populated places disestablished in 2000
Former towns in Ontario